Ravisheth Patil is an Indian politician and a member of the 14th Maharashtra Legislative Assembly. He represents Pen (Vidhan Sabha constituency) and he belongs to the Bharatiya Janata Party.

References

Maharashtra MLAs 2019–2024
Marathi politicians
Bharatiya Janata Party politicians from Maharashtra
Living people
Year of birth missing (living people)